Menippe (Ancient Greek: Μενίππη Menippê means 'the courageous mare' or 'sipper') in Greek mythology may refer to the following women:
 Menippe, one of the 3,000 Oceanides, water-nymph daughters of the Titans Oceanus and his sister-spouse Tethys.
 Menippe, the "divine" Nereid, one of the 50 marine-nymph daughters of the 'Old Man of the Sea' Nereus and the Oceanid Doris.
 Menippe, daughter of Orion, see Menippe and Metioche
 Menippe, a Thessalian naiad daughter of the river-god Peneus. By Pelasgus, she became the mother of Phrastor, who emigrated to Italy and there became the king of the Tyrrhenians.
 Menippe, daughter of Thamyris and mother of Orpheus by Oeagrus.
Menippe, one of the Amazons. She fought in Aeetes' army against the troops of Perses.

Notes

References 

 Dionysus of Halicarnassus, Roman Antiquities. English translation by Earnest Cary in the Loeb Classical Library, 7 volumes. Harvard University Press, 1937-1950. Online version at Bill Thayer's Web Site
 Dionysius of Halicarnassus, Antiquitatum Romanarum quae supersunt, Vol I-IV. . Karl Jacoby. In Aedibus B.G. Teubneri. Leipzig. 1885. Greek text available at the Perseus Digital Library.
 Gaius Julius Hyginus, Fabulae from The Myths of Hyginus translated and edited by Mary Grant. University of Kansas Publications in Humanistic Studies. Online version at the Topos Text Project.
 Gaius Valerius Flaccus, Argonautica translated by Mozley, J H. Loeb Classical Library Volume 286. Cambridge, MA, Harvard University Press; London, William Heinemann Ltd. 1928. Online version at theio.com.
 Gaius Valerius Flaccus, Argonauticon. Otto Kramer. Leipzig. Teubner. 1913. Latin text available at the Perseus Digital Library.
 Hesiod, Theogony from The Homeric Hymns and Homerica with an English Translation by Hugh G. Evelyn-White, Cambridge, MA.,Harvard University Press; London, William Heinemann Ltd. 1914. Online version at the Perseus Digital Library. Greek text available from the same website.
 Kerényi, Carl, The Gods of the Greeks, Thames and Hudson, London, 1951.
Publius Ovidius Naso, Metamorphoses translated by Brookes More (1859-1942). Boston, Cornhill Publishing Co. 1922. Online version at the Perseus Digital Library.
 Publius Ovidius Naso, Metamorphoses. Hugo Magnus. Gotha (Germany). Friedr. Andr. Perthes. 1892. Latin text available at the Perseus Digital Library.
Tzetzes, John, Book of Histories, Book I translated by Ana Untila from the original Greek of T. Kiessling's edition of 1826.  Online version at theio.com

Naiads
Nereids
Oceanids
Children of Peneus
Amazons (Greek mythology)
Mythological Thracian women
Greek mythology of Thrace